Canterbury was granted a city charter in 1448 which gave it the right to have a mayor and a sheriff.
The city's web site records that
King Henry VI decreed that the City should be "of one Mayor and one commonalty, wholly corporate for ever". The first mayor elected under royal charter was John Lynde.

The responsibilities of mayors have diminished over the years. They were once in charge of keeping the peace, serving as chief magistrate and presiding over the local lawcourt. This caused problems as the mayor could be asked to chair sessions without experience or knowledge of law. The Justices of the Peace Act of 1968 decreed that mayors were no longer entitled to sit as magistrates by virtue of their office alone.

The dignity and title of lord mayor was granted on 13 July 1988 whilst the 12th Lambeth Conference of the Anglican Church was being held in the city.

A complete chronological list of bailiffs (1380–1447) and mayors (1448–1800) is given in Edward Hasted, The History and Topographical Survey of the County of Kent, vol. 12 (1801) pp. 603–611, available online from British History Online, page 63714.
Names not otherwise referenced in the list below are taken from this source.

Mayors of Canterbury

15th century

16th century

17th century

18th century

19th century

20th century

Lord Mayors of Canterbury

See also 
 Sheriff of Canterbury

References 

 
People from Canterbury
History of Canterbury
Canterbury